Alex Grecian (born Alexander Douglas Grecian on August 6, 1969) is an American author of short fiction, novels, comic books, and graphic novels. His notable works include the comic book series Proof and the novels in the  Scotland Yard's Murder Squad series: The Yard, The Black Country, The Devil's Workshop, The Harvest Man, Lost and Gone Forever, and The Blue Girl. He has been nominated for the Strand Award for Best Debut Novel for The Yard, The Dilys Award for The Black Country, and the Barry Award for Best First Novel for The Yard. He was also the recipient of an Inkpot Award in 2018 and of the Kansas Notable Book Awards from the State Library of Kansas for The Yard, The Black Country, and The Devil's Workshop.

Career 
Famous Author

Literary influences 

As a child and a teenager, Grecian read the works of C. S. Lewis, Charles Dickens, Lewis Carroll, and Edgar Allan Poe. He later became a fan of crime fiction, reading the works of authors as diverse as Graham Greene, Donald E. Westlake, Ross Macdonald, and John D. MacDonald. Other influences include John Irving, Kurt Vonnegut, Michael Chabon, and Stephen King.

Comics and graphic novels 

Grecian's first comic book work, released in 2006, was a collaboration with Canadian comic book artist and illustrator Riley Rossmo on Seven Sons, a graphic novel based on the anonymously written Chinese folktale Ten Brothers known to be written around the time of the Ming Dynasty (1368 to 1644). In 2007, he started work on Proof, also with Riley Rossmo. NPR named this series one of the best books of 2009. Grecian and Rossmo started on their third project together, Rasputin, in the fall of 2014. This series is a work of fiction based on the life of Grigori Rasputin. Rasputin was a mystical adviser in the court of Czar Nicholas II of Russia in the early nineteen hundreds.

In 2013, with fellow creators B. Clay Moore, Jeremy Haun, and Seth Peck, Grecian developed the anthology Bad Karma using a Kickstarter campaign. Bad Karma is a hardcover comics, prose and art collection featuring five separate, inter-related creator-owned concepts.

Novels 

In May 2012 Grecian's debut novel The Yard was released by G. P. Putnam's Sons. This novel is the first in the Murder Squad Series. The second novel in the series, The Black Country was released in May 2013, then the third, The Devil's Workshop in May 2014, the fourth, The Harvest Man in May 2015, and the fifth, Lost and Gone Forever in May 2016. The e-book The Blue Girl is also a story of the Murder Squad and was released in June 2013. In April 2018 Grecian released the stand-alone book The Saint of Wolves and Butchers also published by G. P. Putnam's Sons.

Bibliography

AiT/Planet Lar 

 Seven Sons (AiT/Planet Lar, 88 pages, 2006)

Image Comics 

Proof Book 1: Goatsucker (collects Proof #1-5, Image Comics, 128 pages, June 2008)
Proof Book 2: The Company Of Men (collects Proof #6-9, Image Comics, 128 pages, December 2008)
Proof Book 3: Thunderbirds Are Go! (collects Proof #10-16, Image Comics, 144 pages, July 2009)
Proof Book 4: Julia (collects Proof #18-23, Image Comics, 128 pages, July 2010)
Proof Book 5: Blue Fairies (collects "Proof" #24-28, Image Comics, 128 pages, December 2010)
Proof Book 6: Endangered (collects "Proof Endangered" #1-5, Image Comics, 128 pages, December 28, 2011)

Fractured Fables (Image Comics, 160 pages, July 2010)
Dia de Los Muertos (collects #1-3, Image Comics, tpb, 128 pages, November 2013)
Rasputin Volume 1 (collects Rasputin #1-5, Image Comics, 184 pages, May 2015)
Rasputin Volume 2 (collects Rasputin #6-10, Image Comics, 136 pages, February 2016)

Vertigo (DC Comics) 

The Unexpected (Vertigo (DC Comics), tpb, 160 pages, 2013)

G. P. Putnam's Sons 

 The Yard (G. P. Putnam's Sons, May 2012)
 The Black Country (G. P. Putnam's Sons, May 2013)
 The Blue Girl (G. P. Putnam's Sons, June 2013, ASIN B00B1FG9DA)
 The Devil's Workshop (G. P. Putnam's Sons, May 2014)
 The Harvest Man (G. P. Putnam's Sons, May 2015)
 Lost and Gone Forever (G. P. Putnam's Sons, May 2016)
 The Saint of Wolves and Butchers (G. P. Putnam's Sons, April 2018)

Ellery Queen's Mystery Magazine 

 Unknown Caller (Ellery Queen's Mystery Magazine, July 2014)
 The Scarlet Box (Ellery Queen's Mystery Magazine, January/February 2022)

TKO Studios 

 One Eye Open (TKO Studios, March 2022)

Selected awards and honors 

2012 The New York Times Best Seller list for The Yard
2013 Barry Award (for crime novels) nomination for Best First Novel for The Yard
2013 Strand Magazine's Critic's Award nomination for Best Debut Novel for The Yard
2013 The Kansas Notable Book Awards List for The Yard
2014 Dilys Award nomination for Mystery Title of the Year for The Black Country
2014 The Kansas Notable Book Awards List for The Black Country
2015 The Kansas Notable Book Awards List for The Devil's Workshop
2017 The Kansas Notable Book Awards List for Lost and Gone Forever 
2018 Inkpot Award for The Saint of Wolves and Butchers

References

External links 

 
 
 
 

Living people
American comics writers
21st-century American novelists
American male novelists
American mystery writers
1969 births
21st-century American male writers
Inkpot Award winners
Horror writers